Harry Clarence Leary Jr. (born February 22, 1959, in Lynwood, California U.S.) was a professional bicycle motocross (BMX) racer.

Nicknamed "Scary Harry Leary", and later "Turbo", the former for his aggressive racing style, the latter was a moniker coined by Bicycle Motocross Action magazine when he "Turboed" himself into finishing National No. 2 in both the American Bicycle Association (ABA) and the National Bicycle League (NBL) in 1981 after being relatively far back in the national standings during that year. His prime competitive years were from 1978 to 1985. He officially retired from BMX Senior pro ("AA" in the ABA and "A" (Elite Men) in the NBL) racing in 1989, and for the previous three years he was largely inactive and served as Diamond Back's factory team manager. He came out of "retirement" in the early 1990s to race in the ABA's Veteran Pro class and is still racing at 48 years of age.

One of the most respected racers in BMX history, his career was not as laden with titles as many of his contemporaries. His career was plagued by many injuries, in particular his knees which cut many promising seasons off and required surgery. Also, he had trouble dealing with the fame, as limited to the BMX world as it was, that his career brought. He went as far as to attend a sports medicine clinic for stress management in July 1984. He met many stars of the more established sports at the facility. The stresses that come with the burden of fame was and is a widespread if little discussed aspect in the career of a top amateur or professional athlete.

Perhaps despite his attendance of the clinic, Harry Leary could never really get the psychological aspect of the sport, similar to Tommy Brackens but even more so. In addition, while Tommy had a problem with attitude but remained physically healthy for the vast majority of his career, Harry had both mental attitude and physical injury to contend with. His physical misfortunes often happened when he was on a streak of doing well, cutting promising seasons off, perhaps a No. 1 season.

He never won a major title as a top amateur or professional, his biggest win being the $5000 first place award at the 1982 Murray World Cup. He won a measure of redemption when he won back to back ABA Veteran Pro No. 1's in 1993 & 1994 against many of his 1980s peers. He later raced well into his 40s in The Veterans Pro class (which is similar in concept to golf's Champions Tour). In October 2007 he reclassified as an amateur and 30 years of professional racing came to an end. He currently races in the 36 & Over Expert Class. He raced as recently the ABA So. Cal. Nationals on February 16, 2008, in 36 & Over Expert Class coming 7th place in an eight-man main in that 20" division but first place in the 24" 46-50 Cruiser Class.

Racing career milestones

Note: In the early days of professional racing, 1976 and prior, many tracks offered small purse prize money to the older racers of an event, even before the official sanctioning bodies offered prize money in formal divisions themselves. Hence early professionals like Stu Thomsen turning "pro" in 1975 at 16 years old racing for small amounts of money at track events when offered even before the NBA, regarded as the first true national BMX sanctioning body, had a professional division. The NBA was the first sanctioning body to establish one, beginning in 1977. For the sake of consistency and standardization noted professional first are for the first pro races for prize money offered by official BMX sanctioning bodies and not independent track events. Professional first are also on the national level unless otherwise indicated.

Started Racing: July 30, 1974 age 15.

First race bicycle: Schwinn Sting-Ray

First race result: First place, 14 & Over Open.

First local win: See above.

Sanctioning body: National Bicycle Association (NBA).

Home sanctioning body district(s): National Bicycle Association (NBA) District "X" (Orange/Los Angeles County);

First National win:

First sponsor: Coates Schwinn Bike Shop 1974–1975.

Turned Pro*: 1977 Age 18. He was one of the first eight official professionals. Leary credited Bob Hadley for getting the pro class started. BMX Action Bike October/November 1982 Iss.4 pg.33

First Pro race result*: Third.

First Pro win*:

Height and weight at peak of his career (1983): Ht:5'6", Wt:167 lbs

Retired from A/AA** senior pro circuit: Officially after the 1989 ABA Grand Nationals at age 30 on November 29, 1989, Just as he had to tell the entire Diamondback team that they were discontinued due to their not winning a national title. He had not raced much in the preceding three years due to injuries and commitments as Diamond Back's Team manager which he began in early 1988. Like a lot of notable retired pros, they didn't stop racing completely. He raced the two day, two event 1991 ABA Fall Nationals with a fourth in Pro Cruiser and a third in Pro Open on Saturday. While he was retired from the top competition in the "A" pro class ("AA" in ABA parlance) point and money chases, he was reclassified as an "B" pro ("A" pro in ABA parlance) and later as a Veteran pro in the 20" class and raced competitively well into his mid 40s.

In 2007 he ended his professional career and reclassified himself as an amateur, still racing at 48 years of age.

*At the time there was no separate pro class for pros due to the relatively small number of pros. They raced with the 16 Experts, making it a Pro/Am class essentially. This is why during the early years of the pro division the national number one racer of a sanctioning body could be either an amateur or professional. This practice continued until the NBA's 1979 season in which the pros earned separate pro points and a separate pro plate from the amateurs. The NBL and ABA followed suit a year later.

**"A"/Elite Men/"AA" Pro (depending on the era) in the NBL; "AA" Pro in the ABA.

Career factory and bicycle shop sponsors

Note: This listing only denotes the racer's primary sponsors. At any given time a racer could have numerous co-sponsors. Primary sponsorships can be verified by BMX press coverage and sponsor's advertisements at the time in question. When possible exact dates are given.

Amateur
Coates Schwinn Bike Shop: 1974–1975
JMC (Jim Melton Cyclery) Racing Equipment: 1975 – March 1980. Turned professional while with this sponsor.

Professional
JMC Racing Equipment: 1975 – March 1980. Harry quit JMC because he felt they had no confidence in him as a racer past being a regional pro. as well as apparently Jim Melton, the head of JMC, not taking the team to nationals.
DiamondBack (Centurion): March 1980 – 1992. After leaving JMC, he had a hard time finding a sponsor "'cos I never won anything big" At a national he had an announcement made that he was looking for a sponsor. Diamondback Team Manager Sandy Finkleman heard it and signed him on a six-month probationary trial basis.  He became DiamondBack's BMX racing team manager in October 1986.
SE Racing: 1992
Balance Sports: 1993-Mid 1995.
Leary Dirtwerx BMX products: October 1995 – 2000. This was Harry Leary's own BMX bicycle company.
Marzocchi: 2001-Early 2003.
Specialized: Early 2003 – October 2003
Cutting Edge: October 2003 – 2005
SPR Schwinn: 2006–2007

Amateur

GHP/Applied BMX Training: 2007–Present. in October 2007 Leary reclassified himself as an amateur, ending 30 years of professional racing.

Career Bicycle Motocross titles

Note: Listed are District, State/Provincial/Department, Regional, National and International titles. Only sanctioning bodies that were active during the racer's career are listed. Depending on point totals of individual racers, winners of Grand Nationals do not necessarily win National titles. Series and one off Championships are also listed in block.

Amateur
National Bicycle Association (NBA)
None
National Bicycle League (NBL)

American Bicycle Association (ABA)
None

Professional
National Bicycle Association (NBA)

1978 16 & Over Expert Western States Champion.*

*During this era with the NBA, professionals could and did race with the amateurs and earn amateur titles even though they had their own class called "Open Expert". This was because the pro class was still relatively small.

National Bicycle League (NBL)

1981 Pro National No. 2

American Bicycle Association (ABA)
1981 "AA" Pro & Pro Trophy Grandnational Champion

1986 Porsche Design Pro Series Champion
1993, 1994 National No.1 Veteran Pro.

International Bicycle Motocross Federation (IBMXF)
1982 "A" Pro Murray World Cup Champion
1985 Canada Cup Pro Champion
1985 Third Place Pro 20" World Champion

BMX product lines
1979 JMC "Harry Leary" complete race bicycle.
Product evaluation:

Product evaluation:
BMX Action September 1982 Vol.7 No.9 pg.48 Model year 1982

Product evaluation:
1996 Dirtwerx LearyDirtwerx 20XLPro complete race bicycle
Product evaluation:
Snap BMX Magazine September/October 1996 Vol.3 Iss.5 No.12 pg.58

Notable accolades

A BMX jumping style he invented is named after him, a "Leary". It involves launching a bicycle to a great height off a ramp or dirt berm. Near the apex of the jump, the rider turns the handlebars of his bicycle until they are practically facing backwards. He also kicks the rear portion of the bicycle to the side until it is 90 degrees to the direction of travel. As he does this, his upper body twists to follow it around as he maintains his grip on the bars, his back almost completely pointing toward his direction of travel and his face almost completely pointing rearward, as if trying to execute a quick 180-degree turn in mid air. At this extreme position lower the shin of his leg, either his left or right depending in which direction he turned the bars, is resting on the top tube of the frame of his bicycle. His feet ideally stay in contact with the pedals. He maintains this position for a second at most and then uncoils himself before landing. The whole maneuver takes about one to two seconds.

Many have claimed credit or were given credit for the invention of this jump, including Tim Judge and Jeff Utterback, but a photo in an October 1976 issue of Bicycle Motocross Weekly confirms that Leary was the first documented case of anyone doing a "Leary". At the time of the controversy, the maneuver was generically and neutrally known as a "Helicopter". Today, the modern variation of the "Leary" is called a "Lookback". This is an extreme version of the "Leary" in which when executed perfectly the knees are locked with the legs completely parallel with the ground, as is the bicycle, with the bicycle's head tube pointing straight at the rider's crotch. The rider's feet are perfectly flat on the pedals with the crank arms perpendicular with the ground. Another variation is the "Turndown". The rider has the bicycle pointing up, i.e. the front end of the bike pointing toward the sky with the rider twisted around and facing toward the back wheel with the bicycle's head tube pointing toward the rider's chest. An even more extreme variations is the "Turndown Flip", which is a "Leary" with the rear wheel almost completely pointing toward the sky at as much as a 70 degree angle.

Harry Leary was a founding member of the Professional Racing Organization (PRO) racers guild in 1977.
Harry Leary is a 1986 Inductee of the ABA BMX Hall of Fame

Significant injuries

Tore the medial meniscus cartilage in his left knee when fellow pro Clint Miller ran into him in a race at the July 24, 1982, NBL/IBMXF Huffy World Championship in Dayton, Ohio. It laid him up for ten weeks, cutting off a promising racing season. Unfortunately he re-injured the knee at the ABA North Bergen, New Jersey East Coast Nationals in the following October. He had to undergo arthoscopic knee surgery and was laid up for a further two months, not racing again until December 20, 1982, on the local level. He was not back up to race form until mid 1983. The two injuries effectively put him out of contention for almost one full year.
Severely bruised a shoulder in a crash at an ABA national in Shreveport, Louisiana, in February 1984. He sat out a few nationals.
Ruptured a ligament in his knee in the Norco, California NBL National on Sunday June 19, 1988, and was laid up for approximately four weeks.

Racing habits and traits
Had a reputation of being as, Snap BMX Magazine put it, "High Strung", i.e. having a volatile temper. Considered generally a good example of the sport, he does have a volatile side. In mid 1980, just after he was picked up by Diamondback he received a one-month suspension at his local track in West Covina, California, for striking a fellow racer in which he got into an altercation with. It was apparently not without provocation. Leary and this local pro racer were at odds with each other for actions on the race course for their mutually aggressive style of racing. As Leary explained in the October/November 1982 issue of the British publication BMX Action Bike:

Miscellaneous
He was the first BMX racer to have his signature on a BMX bicycle, namely the Harry Leary Turbo. Racers before him has had bikes named after them, but not with their signature physically on the product. According to Leary, no racer previously did because the  racer didn't want his name associated so closely with the product that if it turned out to be a poor product then his name would suffer in reputation:

Post Racing Career
Doesn't have a post racing career. As is the norm with BMXers, despite "officially" retiring after the 1989 ABA Grand National and after a short layoff he started what amounted to a second BMX career in Veteran Pro. Also as is the norm with many BMXers he also races mountain bikes, earning a Silver Medal in the 1989 Mountain bike World Championship in the dual Dual Slalom class. In the next year he won a 1990 Bronze Medal, again in the Mountain Bike World Championship/Dual Slalom Class. He still races competitively in his first love of BMX, albeit in the Veteran Pro Class in the ABA. He is banging handlebars with fellow long time pros like Eric Rupe and Terry Tenette as of 2006. In 2007 30 years of Pro racing came to an end for Leary when he reclassified as an amateur and began racing in the ABA's 36 & over Expert 20" Class and the 46-50 24" Cruiser Class.
Mister Leary started and owns Leary Dirtwerx, a BMX component company that makes and sells BMX bicycle parts.
He also is a BMX track operator.

BMX magazine and general media interviews and articles
"Harry Leary" BMX Plus! July 1980 Vol.3 No.7 pg.16
"Pictorial: Scary Harry Leary" Bicycle Motocross Action August 1980 Vol.5 No.8 pg.46 Several shots of Harry.
"Front Brake Secrets" Bicycle Motocross Action October 1981 vol.6 no.10 pg.90 Leary's tips on how to use a front brake effectively.
"Harry Leary" Action Now October 1981 Vol.8 No.3 pg.62 Short Article.
"From has-been to HERO: Harry Leary" BMX Plus! February 1982 Vol.5 No.2 pg.18
"Top Pros Speak Out" BMX Action April 1982 Vol.7 No.4 pg.62 Joint interview with Stu Thomsen, Greg Hill, Kevin McNeal, Eric Rupe, Brent Patterson, and Scott Clark, speaking about various issues facing the racing world.
A Harry Leary sidebar. BMX Action September 1982 Vol.7 No.9 pg.53
"Harry Leary Professional" ABA Action October 1982 Vol.5 No.10 pg.26 A sidebar outlining a charitable contribution of Leary's.
"Leary Flies" BMX Action Bike October/November 1982 Iss.4 pg.33
"Turbo Harry Leary" BMX Action May 1983 Vol.8 No.5 pg.35 Résumé/Curriculum Vitae (CV) type article of accomplishments and vital statistics.
"Diamond Back's Pro, Harry Leary" Super BMX June 1983 Vol.10 No.6 pg.22
"Harry & Eddy" BMX Action February 1984 Vol.9 No.2 pg.46 Joint Harry Leary and Eddy King interview.
"Crankin' Conversations With The Turbo Hisself, Harry Leary." BMX Action February 1985 Vol.10 No.2 pg.44
"The Kellogg's Pro Series" BMX Plus! October 1985 Vol.8 No.10 pg.61 Harry Leary himself wrote this account of his and other racers for this invitational race series in Birmingham, England.
"Home Starting Gates" BMX Plus! July 1986 Vol.9 No.7 pg.39 Article about a home electronic starting gate product with Harry Leary testing.
"Coming Back: Diamond Back's Harry Leary" BMX Plus! June 1992 Vol.15 No.6 pg.22 Sidebar mini-interview on Harry Leary's comeback in pro racing.
"Rebuttal" Ride BMX October 1993 Vol.2 Iss.5 No.7 pg.42 (Note: Ride BMX did not number it pages at this time) This is the controversial joint rebuttal issue with Greg Hill refuting issues raised by BMX Dirt Jumper Chris Moeller's interview in the previous issue of Ride BMX magazine (August/September 1993 Vol.2 Issue.4 No.6).
"harry leary" Snap BMX Magazine May/June 1996 Vol.3 Iss.3 No.10 pg.68 Leary discusses his Vet pro career, his bicycle company.
"Leary Dirtwerx" Snap BMX Magazine September/October 1996 Vol.3 Iss.5 No.12 pg.58 Combination article about Leary and his company and product evaluation

BMX magazine covers
Bicycle Motocross News:
None
Minicycle/BMX Action & Super BMX:
June 1983 Vol.10 No.6.(SBMX)
Super BMX Presents The 1985 World Championship Winter 1985. (85) in second place behind and to the right to Gary Ellis (47). Brian Patterson is to Gary's left in third and Eric Rupe in fourth to Harry Leary's behind/left. (SBMX special edition)
Bicycle Motocross Action & Go:
September/October 1978 Vol.3 No.5 behind David Clinton in the lead and behind Scott Clark in second place.
May 1979 Vol.4 No.3 (35x) behind Jeff Bottema (2072), Kevin Jackson (7x), Brian "Kronnuts" Curnell (12x), and Denis Dain (173x). (BMXA)
July 1979 Vol.4 No.7. Famous cover of Harry doing his "Leary" in JMC livery. (BMXA)
August 1980 Vol.5 No.8 (BMXA)
November 1981 Vol.6 No.11 (BMXA)
January 1982 Vol.7 No.1 (BMXA)
May 1982 Vol.7 No.5 behind Scott Clark, and ahead of Clint Miller, Denny Davidow, Gregg Grubbs and Tinker Juarez. (BMXA)
August 1983 Vol.8 No.8 with Brian Patterson in second and Clint Miller in third. (BMXA)
July 1984 Vol.9 No.7 Harry executes a classic "Leary". (BMXA)
February 1985 Vol.10 No.2 (BMXA)
May 1985 Vol.10 No.5 with Kirk Chrisco in second. (BMXA)
September 1985 Vol.10 No.10 with Greg Hill & Pete Loncarevich. (BMXA)
BMX Plus!:
February 1982 Vol.5 No.2
June 1983 Vol.6 No.5*
August 1983 Vol.6 No.8 with Charlie Williams, Eddie Fiola & Kevin Keller.
April 1985 Vol.8 No.4 (2) with Eddy King (5) in insert. Eric Rupe as main image.
June 1985 Vol.8 No.6 jumping over Eddy King.
August 1985 Vol.8 No.8 with Mike Miranda, Scott Clark, Pete Loncarevich, Robert Fehd & Billy Griggs.
July 1987 Vol.10 No.7 in triangle insert (1) ahead of Scott Towne (70) and Robby Rupe. In rectangle insert Tommy Brackens (2) leading unidentifieds. In top circle insert freestyler Mike Dominguez. Main image: freestyler Matt Hoffman.
January 1988 Vol.11 No.1 In right hand insert on F-1 bicycle. In left hand insert freestyler Dizz Hicks. Main Image: Rick Allison on F-1 bicydle.
March 1988 Vol.11 No.3 In top insert second from left with freetyler Woody Itson, BMX Plus! tester Todd Britton, and Kevin Hull. In bottom insert Charles Townsend (15) ahead of Travis Chipres (8) and unidentified. In circular insert Steve Broderson; main image freestyler Josh White.
February 1989 Vol.12 No.2 main image. Top insert unidentified BMX Freestyler and Skateboarder.

*Due to a change in ownership and scheduling conflicts there was no May 1983 issue.
BMX Weekly & BMX Bi-Weekly (British Publication):
 1983 Vol.3 Iss.3 ahead of unknown racer (BMXBiW)
July 5–18, 1985 Vol.5 Iss.13 (BMXBiW)
BMX Action Bike: (British Publication):
October/November 1982 Issue 4
Total BMX:

Bicycles and Dirt:
August 1984 Vol.2 No.9 In insert in third place behind Bart McDaniel (17), and Eric Rupe (33). Racer Tim Judge and Freestyler Woody Itson in main image.
Snap BMX Magazine & Transworld BMX

Moto Mag:

BMX World:

NBA World & NBmxA World (The official NBA/NBmxA membership publication):

Bicycles Today & BMX Today (The official NBL membership publication under two names):

ABA Action, American BMXer, BMXer (The official ABA membership publication under three names):

USBA Racer (The official USBA membership publication):

Notes

External links
A May 2004 flyinghighbmx.com interview

A March 6, 2000 BMXUltra.com Interview
A 2000 Roostbmx.com interview
 The American Bicycle Association (ABA) Website.
 The National Bicycle League (NBL) Website.

1959 births
American male cyclists
BMX riders
Living people
Sportspeople from West Covina, California